The 1956 United States presidential election in Ohio took place on November 6, 1956 throughout all 48 states, which was part of the 1956 United States presidential election. Voters chose 25 representatives, or electors to the Electoral College, who voted for President and Vice President.

Ohio was won by the Republican Party candidate, incumbent President Dwight D. Eisenhower. He won all counties except for Pike County.

Results

Results by county

See also
 United States presidential elections in Ohio

References

1956 United States presidential election
1956
1956 Ohio elections